The men's decathlon event at the 1936 Summer Olympics took place between August 7 & August 8.

Results

100 metres

Long jump

Shot put

High jump

400 metres

110 metre hurdles

Discus throw

Pole vault

Javelin throw

1500 metres

Final standings

Key:  DNF = Did not finish, WR = World record, OB = Olympic best

References

Men's decathlon
1936
Men's events at the 1936 Summer Olympics